Philippos Mar Stephanos  (born 9 May 1952) is an Indian Bishop of the Syro-Malankara Catholic Church. He is the second and current bishop of the Syro-Malankara Catholic Eparchy of the United States of America and Canada, having previously served as Auxiliary Eparch for the Syro-Malankara Catholic Archeparchy of Tiruvalla (2010-2017) .

Biography
On 27 April 1979, Stephanos Thottathil was ordained to the priesthood. Pope Francis appointed Stephanos Thottathil eparch for the Syro-Malankara Catholic Eparchy of the United States of America and Canada on 5 August 2017. On 28 October 2017, Stephanos Thottathil was installed as eparch.

See also

 Catholic Church hierarchy
 Catholic Church in the United States
 Historical list of the Catholic bishops of the United States
 List of Catholic bishops of the United States
 Lists of patriarchs, archbishops, and bishops

References

External links

Syro-Malankara Catholic Eparchy of the United States of America and Canada Official Site

1952 births
Living people
People from Pathanamthitta district
Syro-Malankara bishops
Eastern Catholic bishops in the United States
21st-century Eastern Catholic bishops
21st-century American clergy
Indian Eastern Catholic bishops